Izolda is a feminine given name. Notable people with the name include:

Izolda Barudžija, Serbian and former Yugoslav singer
Vlado Kalember and Izolda Barudzija, pop duo that represented Yugoslavia at the Eurovision Song Contest 1984
Izolda Izvitskaya (1932–1971), Soviet actress

See also
Isolda Dychauk (born 1993), German actress
Szold
Zelda (disambiguation)

Feminine given names
Polish feminine given names
Serbian feminine given names